Number One Gun was a Christian rock band from Chico, California, that was most recently signed to Tooth & Nail Records. They self-released their debut EP Forever in 2002, before releasing their follow-up albums Celebrate Mistakes (2003) on Floodgate Records and Promises for the Imperfect (2005) on Tooth & Nail Records.

In 2006, members of Number One Gun decided to move on to different projects. Schneeweis created a new band called The North Pole Project, Keene and Mallory formed Surrogate, and Sellers moved on to play bass in the band Armed for Apocalypse.

In early 2007, The North Pole Project changed its name to Number One Gun, still as a solo project for Schneeweis.

Number One Gun released The North Pole Project on January 15, 2008 through Tooth & Nail Records. The first song from the album, "Million", was released on PureVolume on September 17, 2007. Number One Gun supported this album by touring from January 15–30, 2008 with Justin Richards from Brighten on guitar and drummer Jonathan Russo (producer, engineer, multi-instrumentalist and owner of Sky Bison Productions).

The band's following release, To the Secrets and Knowledge, was a continuation of the one-man project.

In June 2012, Jeff Schneeweis announced on his Twitter that he was developing a new song under the Number One Gun band name. Further posts on Twitter and Facebook revealed that the original lineup would be reuniting to write and record a new full-length album. In July 2012, the band launched a Kickstarter page to help fund their new album and subsequent tour. In addition, the band announced that Stephen Christian, lead singer of the band Anberlin, would collaborate and contribute vocals for at least one song on the album. The album This Is All We Know was made available on November 27, 2013 to fans who backed the Kickstarter project, and officially released on January 14, 2014 on Tooth & Nail Records.

Discography

References

Christian rock groups from California
Tooth & Nail Records artists
Musical groups established in 2002
Musical groups disestablished in 2006
Musical groups reestablished in 2007
Alternative rock groups from California
2002 establishments in California
Musical groups from Chico, California
Pop punk groups from California